Clonoe is a small village and a civil parish in County Tyrone, Northern Ireland. It includes O'Rahilly Park where the Clonoe O'Rahillys Gaelic Athletic Association (GAA) club play their home games. It was the scene of the Clonoe ambush in 1992.

Notable residents
 Michelle O'Neill

See also
List of civil parishes of County Tyrone

References

Villages in County Tyrone